Hilpertsau is a village in Baden-Württemberg, Germany. It is administratively part of the town of Gernsbach in the Rastatt district.

Geography 

The village is located south of Gernsbach in the Murg Valley.

History 

The first documented mention of Hilpertsau is as 'Hilboltzowe' in the year 1339–1340. On April 1, 1970, Hilpertsau merged with Obertsrot to form the Obertsrot community, which was then incorporated into the town of Gernsbach on July 1, 1974.

References

Villages in Baden-Württemberg